Currier House may refer to:

Currier House (Harvard College), Cambridge, Massachusetts
Currier House (Davenport, Iowa)
Currier House (Almont, Michigan)
Capt. Jonathan Currier House, South Hampton, New Hampshire